Bab-e Shamil (also Romanized as Bāb-e Shamīl, Bāb-i-Shamīl, and Bāb Shamīl; also known as Bāb-i-Shamī) is a village in Golzar Rural District, in the Central District of Bardsir County, Kerman Province, Iran. At the 2006 census, its population was 205, in 47 families.

References 

Populated places in Bardsir County